The 2014–15 Leyton Orient F.C. season was the 116th season in the history of Leyton Orient Football Club, their 99th in the Football League, and ninth consecutive season in the third tier of the English football league system.

At the end of the season Orient were relegated to League Two after failing to beat Swindon Town on the final day of the season, with Colchester United reaching safety by beating Preston North End.

2014–15 squad statistics

Figures in brackets indicate appearances as a substitute
Players in italics are loan players

Transfers

Results

Pre-season friendlies

League One

The fixtures for the 2014–15 season were announced on 18 June 2014 at 9am.

FA Cup

The draw for the first round of the FA Cup was made on 27 October 2014.

League Cup

Football League Trophy

League One table

References

Leyton Orient F.C. seasons
Leyton Orient